Angela Cullen (born 5 August 1974) is a New Zealand physiotherapist and former field hockey player. Since 2015, she has worked for Hintsa Performance and is attached to the Mercedes-AMG Petronas F1 Team. She is best known as the physiotherapist to seven-time Formula One world champion Lewis Hamilton.

Biography
Born in Devonport, New Zealand, in 1974, Cullen played hockey at an international level for New Zealand between the ages of 15 and 21. She holds a degree in health science and physiotherapy.

Cullen worked at the English Institute of Sport in London as a senior physiotherapist, supporting the British Olympic team, UK Athletics the British triathlon team and other corporate clients. In the British Olympic team, she worked with 100 m and 200 m sprinters and the 4 x 100 m relay team, the latter going on to win a gold medal at the 2004 Summer Olympic games in Athens.

Cullen undertook a cycle tour in 2006 riding from Tierra del Fuego to Colombia, cycling up to 155 miles a day. She was later a senior advisor for SPARC High Performance in New Zealand. Cullen also worked with the New Zealand Academy of Sport and Sport New Zealand.

In 2015, Cullen joined the Hintsa Performance company. Following  the death of Aki Hintsa, a mentor to Hamilton, she became Hamilton's physiotherapist and assistant. Cullen took up the role in 2016, also being described as his chauffeur and confidante.

On the 17th of March 2023, it was announced that Angela was moving on and would no longer work alongside Lewis Hamilton.

Personal life
Cullen has two children, a son and a daughter, and lives in the Alps region of France.

References 

1974 births
Living people
Field hockey players from Auckland
Auckland University of Technology alumni
New Zealand physiotherapists
New Zealand female field hockey players
20th-century New Zealand women
21st-century New Zealand women